A tent is a shelter made of fabric or similar material.

Tent or The Tent may also refer to:

Arts, entertainment, and media
Tent (album), a 1979 album by The Nits
The Tent (Atwood book), a 2006 book by Margaret Atwood
The Tent (Paulsen novel), a 1995 Gary Paulsen book
The Tent (film), a 2020 American thriller film
The Tent, a 2008 film produced and directed by Hakan Haslaman
Everyone I Have Ever Slept With 1963–1995 or The Tent, artwork by Tracey Emin

People with the name Tent
Katrin Tent (born 1963), German mathematician
Kevin Tent, American film editor
M. B. W. Tent, American mathematical biographer

Places
Tent Island, an island in McMurdo Sound, Antarctica
Tent Mountain, a mountain straddling the border of the Canadian provinces of British Columbia and Alberta
Tent Nunatak, a nunatak in Graham Land, Antarctica
Tent Peak, a mountain in Ross Island, Antarctica
Tent Rock, a nunatak in Oates Land, Antarctica
The Tent, South Africa, see List of mountains in South Africa

Other uses
Tent (protocol), decentralized communication protocol
TeNT, the tetanus neurotoxin Tetanospasmin 
TEN-T, Trans-European Transport Networks, a planned set of road, rail, air and water transport networks in Europe

See also
 Tente (disambiguation)
 Tenting, in pest control 
Tentpole film, a type of movie